Fords Hill is a mountain located in the Catskill Mountains of New York southeast of Bovina Center. Fords Hill is located south of Mount Pisgah.

References

P

Mountains of Delaware County, New York
Mountains of New York (state)